This list comprises 239 species of non-marine molluscs that have been recorded in the scientific literature as part of the fauna of the island of Great Britain; this total excludes species found only in hothouses and aquaria. The list includes terrestrial and aquatic gastropods, and aquatic bivalves. Molluscs that are fully marine (adapted to live in the sea) are not included here, except for two marine pulmonate snails. In other words, this list includes land snails and slugs, and freshwater and brackish water snails. It also includes freshwater mussels and clams, including some that can tolerate brackish water.

Great Britain is a European island in the northeastern Atlantic, comprising the contiguous countries of England, Scotland and Wales. (Great Britain is not the same entity as the United Kingdom of Great Britain and Northern Ireland; for more information on the complex nomenclature of this area, please see terminology of the British Isles.) The mollusc fauna of the island of Ireland, which includes both the Republic of Ireland and Northern Ireland, is listed in another article: List of non-marine molluscs of Ireland.

A number of species of snails listed here are sometimes also found on lists of marine species. Two listed here, in the genera Onchidella and Otina, are fully marine in habitat, but are pulmonate gastropods that breathe air at low tide rather than having gills like most marine species. Other species listed here live in habitats that are intermediate between land and saltwater, or in brackish water habitats intermediate between freshwater and full-salinity saltwater.

Additional species are still being added to the list of the non-marine malacofauna of Great Britain. Four of the more recent discoveries are: Papillifera papillaris, first recorded in 1993 but probably the result of introductions with Italian statuary a century or more earlier; Selenochlamys ysbryda, a species new to science, which was first found in 2004; Candidula olisippensis, discovered on a Cornish cliff in 2011; and Monacha ocellata, found near Tilbury docks in 2017. Other species have been added to the list as a result of taxonomic revisions; for instance, only in 2009 was it recognised that snails previously known as Pupilla muscorum constituted two sibling species occupying different habitats, with both Pupilla muscorum sensu stricto and Pupilla alpicola occurring in Britain. A major revision of the slug fauna published in 2014, partly based on genetic sequencing, established that there were 20% more species than had previously been recognised. Not all these species have been definitely identified and some are formally undescribed.

In addition to the species that survive outdoors in Great Britain, there are also another 15 exotic gastropod species (some terrestrial and some aquatic) which live as "uninvited guests" in greenhouses and their enclosed aquaria. These species are known as "hothouse aliens", and are listed separately at the end of the main list. In this list these species are not counted as part of the fauna. Also not included are species such as Eobania vermiculata and Milax nigricans that have been found outdoors on single occasions but seem never to have established persisting populations.

The following table shows a summary of species numbers.

Conservation 
Those species that are recognized as endangered are shown with an E after their name, see List of endangered species in the British Isles.

Some species are protected in the United Kingdom under the Wildlife and Countryside Act 1981:
 Catinella arenaria and Myxas glutinosa are fully protected since 1981
 Margaritifera margaritifera is partly protected since 1991 and fully protected since 1998
 Helix pomatia is partly protected since 2008
 Monacha cartusiana was fully protected from 1981 to 1988.

Two of the land snails on the list (Fruticicola fruticum and Cernuella neglecta) are now locally extinct (in Great Britain, sometimes abbreviated here as G.B.), but they still occur in other parts of Europe.

Systematic list
The list is arranged by presumed biological affinity, rather than being alphabetical by family.

A number of species are listed with subspecies, in cases where there are well-recognized subspecies in different parts of Europe. For some species a synonym is given, where the species may perhaps be better known under another name.

An attempt has been made to label the families as aquatic, terrestrial or intermediate, and an indication is given where it is thought that the species is introduced. Some introductions to Great Britain are quite ancient, dating from Roman times or even earlier. Those species that do not have a shell usually do not leave an archeological or fossil record, and therefore it is not always possible to determine whether they are native or introduced. Species are considered to be native, unless otherwise indicated on the list; this information is taken from Kerney (1999) updated in the case of slugs with the opinions of Rowson et al. (2014). The status and taxonomy of freshwater gastropods has been updated according to Rowson et al. (2021).

Note: the images used to illustrate the list are mostly of specimens that were found in other countries.

Gastropoda

 Neritidae – aquatic (this species tolerates brackish water)
 Theodoxus fluviatilis fluviatilis (Linnaeus, 1758)

 Aciculidae – terrestrial
 Acicula fusca (Montagu, 1803)

 Viviparidae – aquatic
 Viviparus contectus (Millet, 1813)
 Viviparus viviparus (Linnaeus, 1758)
 Cipangopaludina chinensis (Gray in Griffith & Pidgeon, 1833) – introduced

 Assimineidae – terrestrial (intermediate marine)
 Assiminea grayana J. Fleming, 1828
 Paludinella globularis (Hanley in Thorpe, 1844) – synonym: P. littorina auct. non delle Chiaje, 1828

 Amnicolidae – aquatic
 Marstoniopsis insubrica (Küster, 1853) – synonym: Bithynella scholtzi (A. Schmidt, 1856) – perhaps introduced, perhaps extinct

 Truncatellidae – terrestrial (intermediate marine)
 Truncatella subcylindrica (Linnaeus, 1758)

 Bithyniidae – aquatic
 Bithynia leachii (Sheppard, 1823)
 Bithynia tentaculata (Linnaeus, 1758)

 Cochliopidae – aquatic
 Semisalsa stagnorum (Gmelin, 1791) – synonym: Heleobia stagnorum – uncertain if native

 Potamopyrgidae – aquatic
 Potamopyrgus antipodarum (Gray, 1843) – introduced

 Hydrobiidae – aquatic (some are arguably marine)
 Hydrobia acuta (Draparnaud, 1805) – subspecies: Hydrobia acuta neglecta Muus, 1963
 Ecrobia ventrosa (Montagu, 1803) – synonym: Ventrosia ventrosa
 Peringia ulvae (Pennant, 1777)
 Mercuria anatina (Poiret, 1801) – synonyms: M. confusa auct. non Frauenfeld, 1863, M. similis auct. non (Draparnaud, 1805)

 Valvatidae – aquatic
 Valvata cristata O.F. Müller, 1774
 Valvata macrostoma Mörch, 1864
 Valvata piscinalis (O.F. Müller, 1774)

 Pomatiidae – terrestrial
 Pomatias elegans (O.F Müller, 1774)

The following gastropods are pulmonates:

 Ellobiidae – terrestrial
 Carychium minimum O.F Müller, 1774
 Carychium tridentatum (Risso, 1826)
 Leucophytia bidentata (Montagu, 1808)
 Myosotella denticulata (Montagu, 1803)
 Myosotella myosotis (Draparnaud, 1801)

 Onchidiidae – aquatic (marine but an intertidal pulmonate)
 Onchidella celtica (Cuvier, 1817)

 Otinidae – aquatic (marine but an intertidal pulmonate)
 Otina ovata (Brown, 1827)

 Lymnaeidae – aquatic
 Ampullaceana balthica (Linnaeus, 1758) – synonyms: Radix balthica, Radix peregra auct. non (O.F. Müller, 1774)
 Galba truncatula (O.F. Müller, 1774)
 Ladislavella catascopium (Say, 1817) – introduced, believed extinct
 Lymnaea stagnalis (Linnaeus, 1758)
 Myxas glutinosa (O.F. Müller, 1774) E
 Omphiscola glabra (O.F. Müller, 1774)
 Radix auricularia (Linnaeus, 1758)
 Stagnicola fuscus (C. Pfeiffer, 1821) – synonym: Lymnaea fusca
 Stagnicola palustris (O.F. Müller, 1774)  – synonym: Lymnaea palustris

 Physidae – aquatic
 Aplexa hypnorum (Linnaeus, 1758)
 Physa fontinalis (Linnaeus, 1758)
 Physella acuta (Draparnaud, 1805) – synonym: Physella heterostropha (Say, 1817) – introduced
 Physella gyrina (Say, 1821) – introduced

 Planorbidae – aquatic
 Ancylus fluviatilis (O.F. Müller, 1774)
 Anisus leucostoma (Millet, 1813)
 Anisus spirorbis (Linnaeus, 1758)
 Anisus vortex (Linnaeus, 1758)
 Anisus vorticulus (Troschel, 1834) E
 Bathyomphalus contortus (Linnaeus, 1758)
 Ferrissia californica (Rowell, 1863) – synonyms: F. wautieri (Mirolli, 1960), F. fragilis (Tryon, 1863) – introduced
 Gyraulus acronicus (A. Férussac, 1807)
 Gyraulus albus (O.F. Müller, 1774)
 Gyraulus crista (Linnaeus, 1758)
 Gyraulus laevis (Alder, 1838)
 Hippeutis complanatus (Linnaeus, 1758)
 Menetus dilatatus (Gould, 1841) – introduced
 Planorbarius corneus corneus (Linnaeus, 1758)
 Planorbis carinatus O.F. Müller, 1774
 Planorbis planorbis (Linnaeus, 1758)
 Segmentina nitida (O.F. Müller, 1774) E

 Acroloxidae – aquatic
 Acroloxus lacustris (Linnaeus, 1758)

 Succineidae – terrestrial (some almost amphibious)
 Quickella arenaria (Potiez & Michaud, 1838) – synonym:Catinella arenaria
 Succinella oblonga Draparnaud, 1801
 Succinea putris Linnaeus, 1758
 Oxyloma elegans elegans (Risso, 1826) – synonym: Oxyloma pfeifferi (Rossmässler, 1835)
 Oxyloma sarsii (Esmark, 1886)

 Cochlicopidae – terrestrial
 Azeca goodalli (A. Férrusac, 1821)
 Cochlicopa cf. lubrica – synonym: Cochlicopa lubrica (O.F. Müller, 1774)
 Cochlicopa cf. lubricella – synonym: Cochlicopa lubricella (Porro, 1838)

 Pyramidulidae – terrestrial
 Pyramidula pusilla (Vallot, 1801)

 Vertiginidae – terrestrial

 Columella edentula (Draparnaud, 1805)
 Columella aspera Walden, 1966
 Truncatellina cylindrica (Férussac, 1807)
 Truncatellina callicratis (Scacchi, 1833) – probably native
 Vertigo pusilla O.F. Müller, 1774
 Vertigo alpestris Alder, 1838
 Vertigo antivertigo (Draparnaud, 1801)
 Vertigo genesii (Gredler, 1856)
 Vertigo geyeri Lindholm, 1925
 Vertigo lilljeborgi (Westerlund, 1871)
 Vertigo modesta arctica (Say, 1824)
 Vertigo moulinsiana (Dupuy, 1849)
 Vertigo pusilla O.F. Müller, 1774
 Vertigo pygmaea (Draparnaud, 1801)
 Vertigo substriata (Jeffreys, 1833)
 Vertigo angustior Jeffreys, 1830

 Chondrinidae – terrestrial
 Abida secale secale (Draparnaud, 1801)

 Pupillidae – terrestrial
 Pupilla muscorum (Linnaeus, 1758)
 Pupilla alpicola (Charpentier, 1837)

 Lauriidae – terrestrial
 Leiostyla anglica (Wood, 1828)
 Lauria cylindracea (da Costa, 1778)
 Lauria sempronii (Charpentier, 1837) – probably native

 Valloniidae – terrestrial
 Vallonia costata (O.F. Müller, 1774)
 Vallonia pulchella (O.F. Müller, 1774)
 Vallonia cf. excentrica – synonym: Vallonia excentrica Sterke, 1892
 Acanthinula aculeata (O.F. Müller, 1774)
 Spermodea lamellata (Jeffreys, 1830)

 Enidae – terrestrial
 Ena montana (Draparnaud, 1801)
 Merdigera obscura  (O.F. Müller, 1774) – synonym: Ena obscura

 Punctidae – terrestrial
 Punctum pygmaeum (Draparnaud, 1801)
 Paralaoma servilis (Shuttleworth, 1852) – introduced

Helicodiscidae – terrestrial
 Lucilla singleyana – synonym :Helicodiscus singleyanus Pilsbry, 1890 – introduced

 Discidae – terrestrial
 Discus rotundatus rotundatus (O.F. Müller, 1774)

 Arionidae – terrestrial
 Arion ater (Linnaeus, 1758)
 Arion rufus (Linnaeus, 1758)
 Arion flagellus Collinge, 1893 – introduced?
 Arion vulgaris Moquin-Tandon, 1855 – synonym: Arion lusitanicus auct. non Mabille, 1868 – introduced
 Arion sp. "Davies" – introduced?
 Arion subfuscus Draparnaud, 1805
 Arion fuscus O.F. Müller, 1774 – introduced?
 Arion cf. iratii Garrido, Castillejo & Iglesias, 1995 – introduced?
 Arion circumscriptus Johnston, 1828
 Arion silvaticus Lohmander, 1937
 Arion fasciatus (Nilsson, 1823) – introduced?
 Arion hortensis A. Férussac, 1819
 Arion distinctus J. Mabille, 1868
 Arion owenii Davies, 1979
 Arion cf. fagophilus de Winter, 1986 – introduced?
 Arion intermedius (Normand, 1852)

 Pristilomatidae – terrestrial
 Vitrea contracta (Westerlund, 1871)
 Vitrea crystallina (O.F. Müller, 1774)
 Vitrea subrimata (Reinhardt, 1871)

 Euconulidae – terrestrial
 Euconulus fulvus (O.F. Müller, 1774) 
 Euconulus alderi (J.E. Gray, 1840)

 Gastrodontidae – terrestrial
 Zonitoides nitidus (O.F. Müller, 1774)
 Zonitoides excavatus (Alder, 1830)

 Oxychilidae – terrestrial
 Oxychilus alliarius (Miller, 1822)
 Oxychilus cellarius (O.F. Müller, 1774)
 Oxychilus draparnaudi draparnaudi (Beck, 1837) – introduced
 Oxychilus navarricus helveticus (Blum, 1881) – introduced?
 Aegopinella nitidula (Draparnaud, 1805)
 Aegopinella pura (Alder, 1830)
 Nesovitrea hammonis (Ström, 1765) – synonym: Perpolita hammonis
 Daudebardia rufa (Draparnaud, 1805) – introduced

 Milacidae – terrestrial
 Milax gagates (Draparnaud, 1801) – introduced?
 Tandonia rustica (Millet, 1843) – introduced?
 Tandonia budapestensis (Hazay, 1881) – introduced
 Tandonia cf. cristata (Kaleniczenko, 1851) – introduced
 Tandonia sowerbyi (A. Férussac, 1823) – introduced?

 Vitrinidae – terrestrial
 Vitrina pellucida (O.F. Müller, 1774)
 Phenacolimax major (A. Férussac, 1807) – probably native

 Boettgerillidae – terrestrial
 Boettgerilla pallens Simroth, 1912 – introduced

 Trigonochlamydidae – terrestrial
 Selenochlamys ysbryda Rowson & Symondson, 2008 – introduced

 Limacidae – terrestrial
 Limax maximus Linnaeus, 1758
 Limax cinereoniger Wolf, 1803
 Limax cf. dacampi Menegazzi, 1854 – introduced
 Limacus flavus (Linnaeus, 1758) – introduced?
 Limacus maculatus (Kaleniczenko, 1851) – synonym: Limax ecarinatus Boettger, 1881 – introduced
 Malacolimax tenellus (O.F. Müller, 1774)
 Lehmannia marginata (O.F. Müller, 1774)
 Ambigolimax parvipenis Hutchinson, Reise & Schlitt, 2022 – introduced
 Ambigolimax valentianus (A. Férussac, 1822) – introduced

 Agriolimacidae – terrestrial
 Deroceras laeve (O.F. Müller, 1774)
 Deroceras agreste (Linnaeus, 1758)
 Deroceras reticulatum (O.F. Müller, 1774)
 Deroceras panormitanum (Lessona & Pollonera, 1882) – synonym: Deroceras caruanae (Pollonera, 1891) – introduced
 Deroceras invadens Reise, Hutchinson, Schunack & Schlitt, 2011 – introduced

 Ferussaciidae – terrestrial
 Cecilioides acicula (O.F. Müller, 1774) – probably introduced

 Clausiliidae – terrestrial
 Alinda biplicata biplicata (Montagu, 1803) – introduced?
 Balea perversa (Linnaeus, 1758)
 Balea sarsii Pfeiffer, 1847
 Clausilia bidentata bidentata (Ström, 1765)
 Clausilia dubia dubia Draparnaud, 1805 – probably native
 Cochlodina laminata (Montagu, 1803)
 Macrogastra rolphii (Turton, 1826)
 Papillifera papillaris (O.F. Müller, 1774) – introduced

 Testacellidae – terrestrial
 Testacella maugei A. Férussac, 1822 – introduced?
 Testacella haliotidea Draparnaud, 1801 – introduced?
 Testacella scutulum Sowerby, 1821 – introduced?
 Testacella sp. "tenuipenis" – introduced?

 Helicodontidae – terrestrial
 Helicodonta obvoluta obvoluta (O.F. Müller, 1774) – probably native

 Cochlicellidae – terrestrial
 Cochlicella acuta (O.F. Müller, 1774) – introduced?
 Cochlicella barbara (Linnaeus, 1758) – introduced

 Hygromiidae – terrestrial

 Ashfordia granulata (Alder, 1830) – synonym: Monacha granulata
 Candidula gigaxii (L. Pfeiffer, 1850) – introduced?
 Candidula intersecta (Poiret, 1801) – probably introduced
 Candidula olisippensis (Servain, 1880) – introduced
 Cernuella aginnica (Locard, 1894) – introduced
 Cernuella neglecta (Draparnaud, 1805) – introduced, now extinct in G.B.
 Cernuella virgata (Da Costa, 1778) – probably introduced
 Helicella itala itala (Linnaeus, 1758)
 Hygromia cinctella (Draparnaud, 1801) – introduced
 Hygromia limbata  limbata (Draparnaud, 1805) – introduced
 Monacha cantiana (Montagu, 1803) – introduced
 Monacha cartusiana (O.F. Müller, 1774) – introduced?
 Monacha ocellata (Roth, 1839) – introduced
 Ponentina subvirescens (Bellamy, 1839) – probably native
 Pseudotrichia rubiginosa (Rossmässler, 1838) – probably native
 Trochoidea elegans (Gmelin, 1791) – introduced
 Trochulus hispidus (Linnaeus, 1758)
 Trochulus sericeus (Draparnaud, 1801)
 Trochulus striolatus (Pfeiffer, 1828)
 Zenobiella subrufescens (Miller, 1822)

 Bradybaenidae – terrestrial
 Fruticicola fruticum (O.F. Müller, 1774) – probably introduced, now extinct in G.B.

 Helicidae – terrestrial
 Arianta arbustorum arbustorum (Linnaeus, 1758)
 Helicigona lapicida lapicida (Linnaeus, 1758)
 Theba pisana pisana (O.F. Müller, 1774) – introduced
 Cepaea nemoralis nemoralis (Linnaeus, 1758)
 Cepaea hortensis (O.F. Müller, 1774)
 Cornu aspersum aspersum – synonym:Helix aspersa (O.F. Müller, 1774) – introduced
 Helix lucorum Linnaeus, 1758 – introduced
 Helix pomatia Linnaeus, 1758 – introduced?

Bivalvia
 Margaritiferidae – aquatic
 Margaritifera margaritifera (Linnaeus, 1758) E

 Unionidae – aquatic
 Unio pictorum (Linnaeus, 1758)
 Unio tumidus Philipsson, 1788
 Anodonta anatina (Linnaeus, 1758)
 Anodonta cygnea (Linnaeus, 1758)
 Pseudanodonta complanata (Rossmässler, 1835) E

 Sphaeriidae – aquatic
 Sphaerium corneum (Linnaeus, 1758)
 Sphaerium rivicola (Lamarck, 1818)
 Sphaerium nucleus (Studer, 1820)
 Sphaerium solidum (Normand, 1844)
 Musculium lacustre (O.F. Müller, 1774)
 Musculium transversum (Say, 1829)
 Pisidium amnicum (O.F. Müller, 1774)
 Pisidium casertanum (Poli, 1791)
 Pisidium conventus (Clessin, 1877)
 Pisidium henslowanum (Sheppard, 1823)
 Pisidium hibernicum Westerlund, 1894
 Pisidium lilljeborgii (Clessin, 1886)
 Pisidium milium Held, 1836
 Pisidium moitessierianum Paladilhe, 1866
 Pisidium nitidum Jenyns, 1832
 Pisidium obtusale (Lamarck, 1818)

 Pisidium personatum Malm, 1855
 Pisidium pulchellum (Jenyns, 1832)
 Pisidium pseudosphaerium Favre, 1927
 Pisidium subtruncatum Malm, 1855
 Pisidium supinum A. Schmidt, 1851
 Pisidium tenuilineatum Stelfox, 1918 E
 Dreissenidae – aquatic
 Dreissena polymorpha (Pallas, 1771) – introduced
 Dreissena bugensis (Andrusov, 1897) – introduced
 Mytilopsis leucophaeata (Conrad, 1831) – introduced
 Corbiculidae – aquatic
 Corbicula fluminea (O.F. Müller, 1774) – introduced

List of "hothouse alien" species
This group of exotic land and freshwater species are not truly part of the fauna because they do not live in the wild. Many are tropical and thus are incapable of surviving in the wild in Great Britain; instead they have established themselves as uninvited inhabitants of greenhouses, aquaria within greenhouses, and similar artificially-heated  habitats.

 Thiaridae – aquatic
 Melanoides tuberculata (O.F. Müller, 1774)
 Gastrodontidae – terrestrial
 Zonitoides arboreus (Say, 1816)
 Lymnaeidae – aquatic
 Radix rubiginosa (Michelin, 1831), native to Indo-China and Indonesia
 Planorbidae – aquatic
  Gyraulis cf. chinensis (Dunker, 1848)
 Planorbella duryi (Wetherby, 1879)
 Pleurodiscidae – terrestrial
 Pleurodiscus balmei (Potiez & Michaud, 1835)
 Pristilomatidae – terrestrial

 Hawaiia minuscula (Binney, 1841)
 Helicodiscidae – terrestrial
 Helicodiscus parallelus (Say, 1821)
 Streptaxidae – terrestrial
 Gulella io Verdcourt, 1974
 Subulinidae – terrestrial
 Allopeas clavulinum (Potiez & Michaud, 1838)
 Opeas hannense (Rang, 1831)
 Rumina decollata (Linnaeus, 1758)
 Striosubulina sp.
 Subulina octona (Bruguière, 1789)
 Limacidae – terrestrial
 Ambigolimax waterstoni Hutchinson, Reise & Schlitt, 2022 – not recorded since 1930s

See also
 List of endangered species in the British Isles
 Biota of the Isle of Man#Mollusca (molluscs)
 List of non-marine molluscs of Ireland
 List of non-marine molluscs of the Netherlands
 Arthur Erskine Ellis, an important 20th century author on non-marine molluscs of the UK

References

External links
 The Families of British Non-marine Molluscs (Slugs, Snails and Mussels)
 another format of 2005 checklist
 overview of BAP priority species
 UK Biodiversity Action Plans from 1995-1999

Lists of animals of the British Isles
Fauna of Great Britain
Lists of biota of the United Kingdom
Great Brit
Great Britain
Great Britain
Molluscs, non-marine